Jeremías Emanuel Caggiano   (born March 15, 1983) is an Argentine football striker who is currently in Deportivo Español.

Born in Mar del Plata, Caggiano started his career in 2002 with Club Atlético Independiente of the Primera Division Argentina. In 2004, he moved to newly promoted Huracán de Tres Arroyos he scored plenty of goals for the club, but they couldn't avoid relegation at the end of the 2004–2005 season.

his goalscoring bought him to the attention of In the 2006–2007 season he played for Guingamp in Ligue 2 who signed him in 2005. He returned to Independiente for the Apertura 2005 tournament and then went back to France for the resumation of the league in January 2006. In the summer of 2007 it was unearthed he was homesick, although his form for Guingamp did not appear to suffer he was allowed to return to Argentina to play for Estudiantes de La Plata on loan.

On July 2008, it was confirmed that Caggiano had signed for the Chilean team Universidad Católica. Caggiano knows that he hasn't scored an official goal with any team in 3 years. Despite this, Universidad Católica has faith in him that his goal scoring ability will come back and help the club in winning a championship. After 2009 Apertura tournament Universidad Católica doesn't renew his contract, he moved to Gimnasia y Esgrima de Jujuy.

External links
Statistics at Guardian StatsCentre

Clarín 10 questions to Caggiano 

1983 births
Living people
Sportspeople from Mar del Plata
Argentine footballers
Argentine expatriate footballers
Argentine people of Italian descent
Association football forwards
Club Atlético Independiente footballers
Estudiantes de La Plata footballers
Gimnasia y Esgrima de Jujuy footballers
En Avant Guingamp players
Albacete Balompié players
Sport Boys footballers
Londrina Esporte Clube players
Club Atlético Brown footballers
Club Deportivo Universidad Católica footballers
Chilean Primera División players
Argentine Primera División players
Ligue 2 players
Segunda División players
Expatriate footballers in France
Expatriate footballers in Spain
Expatriate footballers in Chile
Expatriate footballers in Ecuador
Expatriate footballers in Peru
Expatriate footballers in Brazil
Expatriate footballers in Venezuela
Argentine expatriate sportspeople in France
Argentine expatriate sportspeople in Spain